This is a list of seasons of Swedish ice hockey club Timrå IK.

Season-by-season record

The first five years: 1937–38 to 1941–42
Note: GP = Games played, W = Wins (2 Pts), L = Losses, T = Ties (1 Pt), Pt(s) = Point(s), GF = Goals for, GA = Goals against, WIK = Wifstavarvs IK, ÖIF = Östrands IF

Joint forces and lower divisions: 1942–43 to 1955–56
Note: GP = Games played, W = Wins (2 Pts), L = Losses, T = Ties (1 Pt), Pt(s) = Point(s), GF = Goals for, GA = Goals against

Top division: 1956–57 to 1974–75
Note: GP = Games played, W = Wins (2 Pts), L = Losses, T = Ties (1 Pt), Pt(s) = Points, GF = Goals for, GA = Goals against

Elitserien and below: 1975–76 to 1998–99
Note: GP = Games played, W = Wins (2 Pts), L = Losses, T = Ties (1 Pt), BP = Bonus points (awarded mid-season for Fortsättningsserien teams from 1986–87 to 1998–99), Pts = Points, GF = Goals for, GA = Goals against

Elitserien: 1999–2000 to 2012–2013
Note: GP = Games played, W = Wins (3 Pts), L = Losses, T = Ties (1 Pt), OTW = Overtime or Shootout wins (1 Pt), Pt(s) = Point(s), GF = Goals for, GA = Goals against, PIM = Penalties in minutes

SHL and HockeyAllsvenskan: 2013–2014 to present
Note: GP = Games played, W = Wins (3 Pts), L = Losses, T = Ties (1 Pt), OTW = Overtime or Shootout wins (1 Pt), Pt(s) = Point(s), GF = Goals for, GA = Goals against, PIM = Penalties in minutes Sources:

References

Tim